Michael Isaac Williams, better known as Zac Williams, (born 27 March 2004) is a Welsh professional footballer who plays as a defender for Crewe Alexandra.

Club career
He made his Crewe debut, aged 17, on 9 November 2021 in an EFL Trophy group game against Wolverhampton Wanderers' under-21's at Gresty Road, before making his league debut in the following game, a 2–0 defeat at Bolton Wanderers. He made his first start in Crewe's next game, helping the side to a 2–0 win over Gillingham at Gresty Road on 20 November 2021, and then enjoyed a run of games as one of Crewe's first choice centre-backs until falling ill in January 2022. He returned to first-team action, coming on as a half-time substitute for Travis Johnson against Portsmouth at Gresty Road, on 8 March 2022.

In May 2022, Williams signed a new contract at Crewe. After 19 first-team appearances the following season, Williams suffered a torn hamstring which was likely to rule him out of action for the remainder of the season.

International career
After winning caps at under-15 and under-16, captaining the team for the latter, he played for the Wales under-18s in March 2021 against England before winning a second cap against the same opposition in September of the same year.

Williams was called up to the Wales under-19s squad for the 2022 UEFA European Under-19 Championship qualifiers against Georgia, Norway and Kosovo, and made appearances against the latter two in October 2021. He earned three further under-19 caps, playing as captain against Hungary and Republic of Ireland, and, after coming on as a second half substitute, scoring against Gibraltar, in 2023 UEFA European Under-19 Championship qualifiers on 21, 24 and 27 September 2022 respectively.

Career statistics

References

2004 births
Living people
Welsh footballers
Wales youth international footballers
Association football defenders
Crewe Alexandra F.C. players
English Football League players